Taste My Beat, Anna Tsuchiya's first solo release as a mini album, was released after the disbanding of her former band Spin Aqua. Although there were no singles made from this mini-album, Taste My Skin was used as a radio single for promotion, included with a PV to air on television. Several western rock musicians assisted Anna with her album who include:
 Josh Freese from A Perfect Circle on Drums
 Justin Meldal-Johnsen, a backup from Beck, on Bass
 Michael Ward, guitarist from Avril Lavigne, on Guitar

Taste My Beat reached #27 on Oricon charts, and stayed on the charts for six weeks and sold more than 8,000 units.

Track listing

Additional Disk Contents
 An off-shot movie
 A screen saver
 A computer wallpaper

Notes
 The song In my hands was used as background music in a Venus Jean television commercial.
 The song Somebody Help Me is featured as the ending theme of the Japanese version of the television program Tru Calling.

References

2006 albums
Anna Tsuchiya albums
Avex Group albums